Little Big Awesome is an American animated television series created by Tomi Dieguez and developed for Amazon by Ben Gruber, in 2016. The series centers around characters Gluko, a shapeshifting pink bouncy jelly blob, and Lennon, Gluko’s beanie-toting best friend. The series incorporates various forms of mixed media, including puppets, 2D animation, and live-action, all against an animated backdrop.

Cast
 Fred Tatasciore as Gluko, Kitty Num-Nums, additional characters
 Jessica McKenna as Lennon (TV series), additional characters
 James Arnold Taylor as Lennon (pilot)
 Alex Jayne Go as Little Bubble
 Dana Snyder as Grandma, additional characters
 Roger L. Jackson as Mr. Sprinkles, additional characters
 Brendon Small as Pointy Things
 Jon Luke Thomas as Mayor, Leon, additional characters
 Jeff Galfer as additional characters
 Lonny Ross as Cricket, additional characters
 Sean Schemmel as additional characters
 Betsy Sodaro as Puddin Peggy, additional characters
 "Weird Al" Yankovic as Mr. Sun (live-action)
 Kat Palardy as Ho Cho Jo, additional characters
 Lennon Parham as Claude, additional characters
 Ennis Esmer as Stuhven, additional characters
 Aimee Mann as The Moon (live-action)
 Mike Mitchell as Gluko's Bed, Lyle
 Kate Micucci as Geremy, Hair Lady
 Dave Franco as Dave
 Yuri Lowenthal as Mord and Gord
 JB Blanc as Derby, Guy with Slide Projector Head, additional characters
 Cissy Jones as Frescha, Hot Chocolate, additional characters
 Richard Steven Horvitz as additional characters
 Helen Slayton-Hughes as Penelope Pitt-Plebop III, additional characters
 Nicole Byer as Puppy Num-Nums, Ho Cho Flo
 Derek Stephen Prince as Kunu, additional characters
 June Diane Raphael as Sheena
 Paul Scheer as Raymond the Cloud (live-action)
 Ben Gruber as Biff
 Michael Bolton as himself (live-action)

Episodes

Awards and nominations

References

External links
 
 

2010s American animated television series
2018 American television series debuts
2018 American television series endings
Amazon Prime Video children's programming
Amazon Prime Video original programming
Animated television series by Amazon Studios
American children's animated adventure television series
American television shows featuring puppetry
American television series with live action and animation
Television series by Amazon Studios
English-language television shows